Statistics of the Scottish Football League in season 1926–27.

Scottish League Division One

Scottish League Division Two

See also
1926–27 in Scottish football

References

 
Scottish Football League seasons